Al Ahly is an Egyptian basketball club, located in Cairo, Cairo Governorate, that plays in the Egypt Basketball Super League. 
Currently, two of its athletes play for the Egypt national basketball team. The team is part of the multi-sports club of the same name.

The club has won six Egyptian Super League titles, eleven Egyptian Cup titles. Internationally, Al Ahly has won the FIBA Africa Champions Cup in 2016, and the Arabophone Championship in 2021.

History

Ahly Basketball team was founded in 1930. It is one of the oldest basketball clubs in Egypt and in Africa.

The team played his first game against Al Ittihad Alexandria in front of the Egyptian King Farouq in 1937.

Al Ahly won its first Egyptian national championship in the 1988–89 season.

In the 2021–22 season, Ahly won its sixth national title and thus qualified for the 2023 season of the Basketball Africa League (BAL). It will be Al Ahly's debut in the new African competition.

Honours

National achievements
Egyptian Super League
  Winners (6) : 1988–89, 1999–00, 2000–01, 2011–12, 2015-16, 2021–22

Egypt Cup
  Winners (10) : 1987-88, 1992–93, 1994–95, 1998–99, 2003–04, 2006–07, 2008–09, 2010–11, 2017–18, 2021–22
Egyptian Mortabat League
  Winners (8) :2005/06, 2006/07, 2016/17, 2017-18, 2018/2019, 2020-21, 2021-22, 2022-23.

International achievements
FIBA Africa Clubs Champions Cup: 1
  Champions : 2016 
  Third place : 2004, 2012
African Basketball Cup Winners' Cup: 2 
  Champions : 1998, 2000

Regional Achievements

Arabophone Cup:
  Champions: 2021
  Runners-up :1991, 1999, 2000 , 2022
  Third place : 1995

Season by season

2016 FIBA Africa victory
The 2016 FIBA Africa Basketball Club Championship (31st edition), was an international basketball tournament held in Cairo, Egypt from 7 to 16 December 2016. The tournament, organized by FIBA Africa and hosted by Al Ahly, was contested by 10 clubs split into 2 groups of five, the top four of each group qualifying for the knock-out stage, quarter, semi-finals, and final.
Al Ahly won the trophy as the first Egyptian basketball team to win it in the new format. At this time, no Egyptian basketball team has reached the final match. By winning this trophy Al Ahly (basketball) became the most titled Egyptian Basketball team 3 titles 1 FIBA Africa Clubs Champions Cup + 2 African Basketball Cup Winners' Cup.

Current team roster 
Roster for the 2022–23 season.

Depth chart

Transfers

Transfers for the 2022-23 season

 Joining
  Walter Hodge from  Capitanes de Arecibo

 Leaving

Technical and managerial staff

Kit manufacturers and shirt sponsors

Home arena 

As Al Ahly started to create teams for handball, basketball, and volleyball; they saw the importance of building an arena to host home matches for these clubs. The process of developing designs and searching for funds began in 1978, but was ultimately postponed due to funding issues. It wasn't until the 4th of February, 1994, that Al Ahly opened its sports hall.

On the 4th of February, 1994, Al Ahly officially opened his hall in a large opening ceremony. The ceremony started with a few words from Al Ahly chairman Saleh Selim. He declared that the hall would be named "Prince Abdalla El Faisl Hall" due to his efforts and assistance for Al Ahly, in his place, Abdallas' son Mohammed El Faisl received a commemorative medal. The first match held at the hall was friendly basketball game between Al Ahly and Ithhadd Alex. Following the friendly was a futsal match between retired players from Al Ahly and El Esmailly, with the likes of Mohmoud El Khatib and Aly Abu Greisha participating in the match.

Notable players

 Abdel Moneim Wahby 
 Abdel Azim Ashry 
 Ehab Amin 
 Amr Gendy 
 Omar Tarek 
 Amine Rzig
 Wayne Arnold
 Mohamed Sayed Soliman

Head coaches
The following is a (incomplete) list of Al Ahly's head coaches:
 Mário Palma: (2021)
 Augustí Julbe: (2021–present)

Club Presidents

See also
 Al Ahly FC
 Al Ahly (volleyball)
 Al Ahly Women's Volleyball
 Al Ahly (basketball)
 Al Ahly Women's Basketball
 Al Ahly (handball)
 Al Ahly Women's Handball
 Al Ahly (table tennis)
 Al Ahly (water polo)
 Port Said Stadium riot
 Al-Ahly TV

References

External links
Eurobasket.com
Presentation on AfricaBasket.com
Twitter Account
Facebook Account
Al Ahly website
Fan website
Fan page

Videos
Al Ahly Basketball Fans Youtube.com video

Basketball
Basketball teams established in 1907
Basketball teams in Egypt